George Maxwell Robeson (March 16, 1829 – September 27, 1897) was an American politician and lawyer from New Jersey. A brigadier general in the New Jersey Militia during the American Civil War, he served as Secretary of the Navy, appointed by President Ulysses S. Grant, from 1869 to 1877. A member of the Republican Party, he also served two terms as a U.S. Representative for New Jersey from 1879 to 1883.

Robeson, a native of New Jersey, graduated from Princeton University at the young age of 18. Robeson studied law and passed the bar in 1850. Practicing law, Robeson diligently worked his way through the legal profession and in 1858 he was appointed a public prosecutor for Camden County. During the American Civil War Robeson associated with the Republican Party and was a member of the New Jersey Sanitary Commission. Appointed Brigadier General by Governor Charles S. Olden, Robeson worked to recruit enlistments to fight for the Union. After the war in 1867, Robeson was appointed New Jersey Attorney General by Gov. Marcus L. Ward. Robeson, as Attorney General, gained national attention after successfully prosecuting Bridget Durgan for the brutal murder of Mrs. Coriell.

Supported by New Jersey Senator A.G. Cattell, Robeson was appointed Secretary of Navy by President Ulysses S. Grant in 1869 after Sec. Adolph E. Borie had resigned office. His tenure lasted about seven and a half years, second in length only, to that of Gideon Welles during the 19th century. He was known to be a hot-tempered, industrious administrator and through his departmental leadership was able to contain the established Naval officer hierarchy. Having limited Congressional funding, he supported and developed the early stages of submarine and torpedo technology, in keeping U.S. harbors safe from foreign attack and secured $50,000 in Congressional funding for the 1871 Polaris expedition led by Charles Francis Hall. The U.S. Navy, however, was not able to keep pace with the modernization of industrial European navies.

Robeson headed the investigation about the controversial death of Hall after the return of the shipwrecked crew in 1873. Robeson supported President Grant and the Radical Republican Reconstruction laws that supported the citizenship and voting rights of African American freedmen. Under Robeson, the U.S. Navy constructed the United States' first two propelled torpedo warships. In 1874, Robeson responded to the naval threat imposed by Spain during the Virginius Affair; having implemented U.S. Naval resurgence, however, Congress refused to pay for the completion of the five new ships. Robeson served briefly as both Secretary of Navy and as ad interim Secretary of War after Secretary of War William W. Belknap abruptly resigned in 1876. Robeson was the subject of two Congressional investigations in 1876 and 1878 on profiting and bribery charges from shipbuilding contracts but was exonerated for lack of material evidence.

Elected in 1878, Representative for New Jersey, Robeson served as minority leader of the Republican Party. Robeson's grandfather was George C. Maxwell and he was the nephew of John Patterson Bryan Maxwell, both having represented New Jersey in the House of Representatives. Defeated from office by Democrat Thomas M. Ferrell in a bitter highly contested 1882 election campaign, Robeson was left $60,000 in debt and forced to sell his Washington D.C. property. As a result of his financial troubles, his wife and family abandoned him while traveling abroad. Robeson moved to Trenton, resumed his law practice, and lived a modest lifestyle until his death in 1897. Although Robeson showed decisive action during the Virginius Affair while Secretary of the Navy, his reputation was marred by allegations of corruption during his tenure.

Early life
George M. Robeson was born on March 16, 1829, in Oxford Furnace, New Jersey, near Belvidere in Warren County. Robeson's family was of Scottish origin and he was a descendant of Andrew Robeson, the surveyor-general of New Jersey in 1668.  His father was Philadelphia Judge William Penn Robeson and his mother was the daughter of U.S. Congressman George C. Maxwell, who served in the 12th U.S. Congress from 1811 to 1813 representing Hunterdon, New Jersey. His brother William P. Robeson, Jr. was a brevetted Brigadier general in the Union Army. Robeson was the nephew of U.S. Congressman John Patterson Bryan Maxwell.

Robeson gained a scholarly reputation by having graduated from Princeton University at the young age of 18 in 1847.  Upon graduation, he studied law in Newark in Chief Justice Hornblower's law office. He graduated and was admitted to the bar in 1850. He was admitted as a legal counselor in 1854. He initially set up his law practice in Newark, but then moved his practice to Jersey City. In 1858, he was appointed public prosecutor for Camden County.

Civil War
During the Civil War, Robeson was appointed a brigadier general in the New Jersey Militia by the Governor of New Jersey. Robeson did not serve in active duty during the war.

Attorney General New Jersey (1867–1869)
Robeson served as the Attorney General of New Jersey from 1867 to 1869. He resigned as Attorney General on June 22, 1869, to become United States Secretary of the Navy.

Coriell murder trial
In May, 1867 Robeson successfully prosecuted Bridget Durgan of brutally murdering Mary Ellen Coriell, Coriell's wife. Robeson was able to gain a conviction of Durgan on circumstantial evidence. Durgan, who had an earlier criminal record, had murdered Mrs. Coriell by stabbing her several times with a kitchen knife, believing that she would take over as wife of Coriell and would raise Mrs. Coriell's child. Robeson had stated that the blood on Durgan's dress was the blood of Mrs. Coriell after a violent struggle to save her life had taken place. Robeson told the jury not to consider Durgan as a woman when making a verdict. Throughout Robeson's closing arguments, Durgan held her head low and constantly had a handkerchief to her eyes. Robeson was applauded by the courtroom audience after he finished giving his closing arguments. The jury only took one hour to deliberate before reaching a verdict. Durgan was convicted by the jury of murder, sentenced to death, and hanged on August 30, 1867.

Secretary of the Navy (1869–1877)
President Ulysses S. Grant, without public knowledge, appointed George M. Robeson Secretary of the Navy on June 25, 1869, having replaced Sec. Adolph E. Borie, who resigned on the same day. Borie had found the duties of running the Navy Department demanding and he decided to resign. Upon Robeson's appointment to office, nobody outside of New Jersey knew who he was. Robeson formally took office on June 26, 1869. This would become one of the longest-held cabinet Naval secretary positions, with the exception of Sec. Gideon Welles. He would serve until March 12, 1877, at the end of President Grant's second term in office and at the beginning of President Hayes's administration. Robeson had no previous affiliation with naval shipbuilding, however, he was familiar with the ocean lifestyle, having grown up in New Jersey. His appointment to the Secretary of Navy was influenced by Sen. A. G. Cattell of New Jersey. Robeson, a young man around 40 upon assuming office, was considered an impatient administrator, high-strung, and strong in physical prowess.

When Congress did not authorize the construction of new ships, Robeson used monies meant for the repair of older ships to make newer ships from almost completely new materials, keeping the name of the older ships, and often making ships larger and replacing wooden hulls with iron. Congress and reformers were critical of Robeson overstepping the law in terms of making new ships by "repairing" older ships. Although he was criticized for overhauling 15 to 16 ironclads costing $4,000,000, navy historian Charles Oscar Paullin stated that under the circumstances of the Virginius Incident that took place in 1873, Robeson's overhauls were "proper and advisable".

Departmental control (1869)
Robeson's predecessor Sec. Borie, Grant's first appointment, had let the Navy Department be run by Rear Admiral David D. Porter.  Borie apparently did not have any interest in running the Navy Department and let Porter have unprecedented authority. All orders from the Naval Department had to go through Porter's office to be approved. Porter was an autocratic administrator, who made as many as 45 "arbitrary and extravagant" changes in only two months in the Navy Department.  According to historian Paullin, Robeson, however, after his appointment in June 1869, assumed strong leadership of the department, and Porter's dogmatic control immediately ended. Sec. Robeson was not willing to be Porter's subordinate, as Borie had been.  Porter was almost barred from the Navy Department Office building, only visiting four times during Robeson's tenure. On November 16, 1870, Robeson wrote Porter a letter specifically stating Porter's limited authority, and Porter was told to report regularly to Robeson's Naval Office in writing. According to historian Donald Chisholm, both Rear Admiral Porter and Rear Admiral Daniel Ammen, a close friend to President Grant, influenced Robeson's decisions as Secretary of Navy. Robeson's first annual report to Congress in 1869 was heavily influenced by Rear Admiral Porter.

Norfolk riot (1870)
During the Reconstruction Era, Secretary of the Navy Robeson arrived in Norfolk, Virginia, on November 1, 1870, and he was saluted by naval warships in the harbor. His purpose was to speak for and support Republican Rep. James H. Platt's reelection to the U.S. Congress. During the stump speech ceremony in honor of Platt, Robeson forcefully advocated Republican Radical Reconstruction. Robeson, in his scholarly way, on the steps of the Norfolk City Hall, spoke on the Republican Party's achievements of successfully defeating the Southern Rebellion; ending the "barbarism of slavery"; elevating millions of African American freedmen by giving them citizenship, full suffrage and education; completing the Pacific Railroad; reducing taxes, and paying off the Civil War debt. Robeson, however, was abruptly interrupted by a Conservative who asked, "If the Republicans have done so much for the slaves, what have they done for their masters?"  Robeson quickly replied that the Republican Party, after the war, had been very gracious to the South by limiting the punishment of hanging, "having destroyed the cause of the crime, to let the crime itself go unpunished". A riot broke out, eggs were thrown, and guns were fired. Several persons were wounded as the meeting broke up, but Robeson was unharmed.

Polaris expedition (1871)

The Polaris expedition, commissioned by Secretary of Navy Robeson, was the United States' first serious attempt at arctic exploration to be the first nation to reach the North Pole. On June 29, 1871, at 7 pm, sailed from the New York Naval Yard, under the authority of Captain Charles Francis Hall. Sec. of Navy Robeson and Hall, who was on his third arctic expedition, had lobbied Congress successfully to fund the expedition. Robeson had written specific instructions on the goals of the mission and implemented a hierarchy of command for when Hall was injured or killed.  Robeson directed the course of the expedition, outfitted for two and one-half years. Robeson ordered anything that was found on the expedition would be the property of the U.S. Government, that monuments would be erected on the journey, records and general conditions of the expedition would be kept, and food caches would be established. Polaris was supplied with every scientific instrument needed for such a dangerous and ambitious expedition.

While traveling west of Greenland under good weather, Polaris broke a sailing record to the highest point northward at 82°29'N. In October 1871, the expedition established a winter camp on Thank God Bay, to prepare to reach the North Pole by dogsled. On October 24, upon his return from an exploratory dogsled party, Captain Hall fell sick after drinking a cup of coffee. Historians now believe Hall was probably murdered by crew member Emil Bessels, who poisoned him with arsenic. Two weeks later, Captain Hall died, and Sidney O. Buddington was put in charge of the expedition, according to Robeson's instructions. Under Buddington's authority, discipline on the expedition declined, as the crew was allowed to carry weapons and stay up all night. Buddington himself raided the ship's medical supply of alcohol and was known to have been drunk. On June 2, 1872, after an unsuccessful attempt to reach the North Pole, the expedition turned south to head back to the New York Navy Yard.  Having been caught in an ice pack, 19 crew members were separated from the ship on an ice floe and floated 1,800 miles before being rescued.

The remaining crew on board the ship was forced to winter off Greenland in October 1872, with Polaris being broken down into two ships. Setting out on the ocean, the remaining expedition crew was rescued by a whaling ship on June 3, 1873. Upon the crew's return, Robeson immediately opened a naval investigation on June 5, 1873, inquiring into Hall's death and Buddington's lack of leadership and crew discipline. Captain Hall's journals and letters had been tampered with and destroyed; they may have contained information that was harmful to both Buddington and Bessels. The investigation under Robeson did not charge Bessels with Hall's murder, although there was circumstantial evidence Bessels did murder Hall. However, the entire Polaris expedition crew was exonerated. In 1968, Captain Hall's body was exhumed and modern scientific testing revealed he had been poisoned by arsenic before his sudden sickness and death. Bessels, who was in charge of Hall's medical care, is now believed to have most likely murdered Hall since Bessels had patriotic ties with his mother country Germany. Although Robeson's final report said Hall had died a "natural" death, certain information may have been suppressed, to prevent scandal. Captain Hall, before his death, named Robeson Channel in honor of Secretary Robeson.

Submarine and torpedo testing (1869–1875)

During Sec. Robeson's tenure, submarine, and torpedo technologies were tested by the U.S. Navy. , an experimental hand-cranked submarine owned by Oliver Halstead, had been semi-officially successfully tested in 1866 by Thomas W. Sweeny. However, the U.S. Navy did nothing with the ship until October 1869, when the ship was examined and recommended to Robeson by Cmdrs. C. Melancthon Smith, Augustus L. Case, and Edmund O. Matthews. Robeson appointed another committee to report on the boat's merit. After the second committee gave a favorable review, Robeson and Halstead signed a contract on October 29, 1869, to purchase the submarine for $50,000. Halstead, who contracted to test the submarine, was murdered, and the testing of Intelligent Whale was stalled for over a year. Because of lax security, in 1872, British officer Rear Admiral Edward Augustus Inglefield sneaked into the New York Navy Yard and inspected the secluded vessel moored on a wharf.

On September 18, 1872, the ship was officially tested by the U.S. Navy; it took on water due to a defective hatch seal. Although deemed a failure, Intelligent Whale represented the U.S. Navy's interest and experimentation in "improving weapons systems" during the 1870s.

The testing of torpedoes proved to be more successful. In July 1869 Robeson established the United States Naval Torpedo Station on Goat Island in the harbor of Newport, Rhode Island. The goal was to find inexpensive and effective underwater defense weapons, including experimentation with torpedoes and torpedo equipment, explosives, and electrical equipment. Robeson gave the station the task of making the self-propelled "Fish" torpedo, modeled after the Whitehead torpedo developed by Englishman Robert Whitehead.

Robeson instructed that the torpedo must be able to go underwater for a considerable distance, at a fair speed, maintaining a straight course, while remaining submerged. Compressed air drove the  diameter, four-bladed propeller. The initial testing of the torpedo worked, although there were leakage problems and the azimith control had difficulty. The depth mechanism worked well.

In the summer of 1872, inventor-entrepreneur John L. Lay's self-propelled remote control torpedo test proved a success for the Bureau of Ordnance. The torpedo testing during the 1870s was the foundation for modern American underwater warfare.

By 1875 all U.S. naval cruisers were outfitted with spar and towing torpedoes, and naval officers were trained in their deployment. USS Intrepid was the first U.S. steam-powered projectile torpedo ship, built seven years before the British , which was roughly of similar design and purpose.

Dedicated Centennial Exposition land (1873)
On July 4, 1873, Robeson dedicated  of West Fairmount Park land set aside by the Fairmount Park Commission for the 1876 Centennial Exposition. President Grant could not attend the event due to the death of his father. Grant chose Robeson to go in his place. Grant's Secretary of War William W. Belknap and Grant's Attorney General George H. Williams were scheduled to attend the dedication ceremony. Robeson later met Grant at Long Branch. The Centennial Exposition opened on May 10, 1876.

Virginius incident and war crisis (1873)

On October 31, 1873, a Spanish warship, Toronado, ran down and captured Virginius, a U.S. merchant ship that was smuggling in weapons and soldiers to aid Cuba's revolt from the mother country Spain. The American public demanded war with Spain, as shocking news poured into the country that 53 British and American citizens who had joined up to aid the Cuban Insurrection were captured on Virginius and shot to death by Spanish Naval authority. In addition to this incident, a state-of-the-art Spanish warship was in port in New York Harbor, which excelled in lethal military technology compared to American warships. On November 14, 1873, Grant ordered the Navy to be put on war footing. Robeson sent a flotilla of U.S. warships, part of the North Atlantic Squadron, to Key West, Florida, 90 miles from Cuba. However, the response time was slow, as the U.S. fleet finally assembled off Key West in late January 1874. The U.S. Navy, was no match for the modern Spanish warships and navy. One U.S. officer stated that two Spanish warships could have decimated the American flotilla, the best ships the U.S. Navy could offer at the time.

During the Virginius crisis, Sec. Robeson decided that the primary goal for the Navy was a naval resurgence program to make monitor warships that could compete with foreign navies. Congress, however, refused to make new ships, believing that the technologically revolutionary ironclads made ten years ago somehow remained modern and were good enough for the U.S. Navy.  In a compromise, Robeson and Congress chose to "rebuild" five of the biggest U.S. warships, including an unfinished USS Puritan and four USS Miantonomahs. The ships were contracted out, torn down and scrapped, to be "rebuilt" as new warships by various contractors approved by Sec. Robeson. Work began in 1874, but Congress refused to give Robeson 2.3 million dollars to complete the ships. The almost complete USS Miantonomah was launched on December 6, 1876. Robeson was criticized for scrapping other monitors to pay for the new ones. Secretary of State Hamilton Fish in December 1874 coolly negotiated a peaceful settlement with Spain, and the State Department successfully arbitrated Spanish reparations to the families of the Americans who had been executed. The Virginius incident brought home the realities of having a weak navy and the need for a naval resurgence.

Ordered double turreted warships (1874)

At the time of the Virginius incident in 1873, Spain had the world’s most modern navy, and its army was composed of battle-hardened veterans of the war in Cuba and the civil war in Spain. In contrast, the post-Civil War demobilization of the U.S. army and navy had rendered both obsolete and insignificant. In response, Sec. Robeson ordered five double-turreted (rotating deck guns) warships on June 23, 1874, to implement U.S. naval resurgence; all participated in the Spanish–American War, which started in 1898. The "rebuilding" of USS Puritan and four Miantonomohs were under the direction of Sec. Robeson. Each ship was redesigned, scrapped, and rebuilt from almost all new ironworks material.

At the beginning of the Spanish–American War, from April 22 through 24, 1898, USS Terror captured three Spanish warships: Almansas, Ambrosia Bolivar and Guido. USS Puritan shelled Matanzas on April 27, 1898. From May 5, 1898, to August 4, 1898, USS Miantonomoh served in a squadron of ships that blockaded the northern coast of Cuba. On May 12, 1898, USS Amphitrite hurled 17  shells shoreward, as well as 30  shells, 30 3-pounders and 22 6-pounders on San Juan, Puerto Rico. On February 10, 1899, USS Monadnock participated in the Battle of Caloocan, a few miles north of Manila.

Inflation bill (1874)
When the nation fell into a depression after the Panic of 1873, Congress responded by passing Bill S.617, dubbed the "inflation bill," that would add $400 million greenbacks (paper currency) into circulation. The bill also advanced an equivalent amount of specie-backed money. Both houses overwhelming approved the bill, believing it would bring relief, to a cash-depleted nation, expecting Grant, to quickly sign it.

Grant, however, contemplated that matter and discussed it with his cabinet, having received the bill on April 14, 1874. He told his cabinet he would not sign the bill, believing it would be "a departure from true principles of finance." Grant's cabinet was both divided and speechless. Robeson spoke up and said he wished "the President had reached a different conclusion." Secretary of War William Belknap said a veto "would array the entire West in opposition." Secretary of State Hamilton Fish approved of Grant's veto. Grant vetoed the bill, while an attempt to override Grant's veto failed in the Senate.

Feud with Bristow (1874)
When Benjamin Bristow was appointed Secretary of Treasury by Grant in June 1874, a feud developed between Bristow and Robeson within a few months. The controversy centered around Robeson wanting to have Senator A.G. Cattell appointed financial agent in London to negotiate a bond issue. Cattell had performed a similar service in 1873 under previous Secretary Richardson. Bristow refused to make the appointment and believed a Treasury appointee could do the job. Bristow lobbied Grant to appoint John Bigelow, head of the Treasury Department's Loan Division. Grant accepted Bristow's choice of Bigelow, but he warned Bristow that Bigelow had a previous episode of drunkness. Bristow went further to undercut Robeson's influence in the Grant cabinet. Bristow told Grant that Robeson's Navy Department was financially mismanaged, and was under the control of former treasury secretary Hugh McCulloch's banking house. Bristow's advisers warned Bristow to cool things off and take a less confrontational approach.

Report on U.S. Navy (1875)
  
On December 6, 1875, Secretary Robeson released his report on the condition of the U.S. Navy. The New York Times stated that the U.S. Navy was "stronger than at any time" since the Civil War. Robeson stated in his report that by 1875 the U.S. Navy was the strongest it had been during Grant's presidential term starting in 1869. The U.S. Navy consisted of 147 ships of every class and description, and twenty-six ships were sailing vessels without any steam power. Intrepid was the second U.S. propelled torpedo warship, built-in 1874. The British Royal Navy would not have a propelled torpedo warship until 10 years later. There was a total of 1,195 guns on all the ships combined. Robeson commented that the U.S. Navy was introducing and experimenting with breech-loading howitzers in the naval system, that Gatling guns were on every ship in the U.S. Navy, and that the Torpedo School at Newport was developing efficient torpedoes that could cause great destruction. Concerning the five double-turreted monitors that Robeson had designed and ordered over a year ago in June 1874, he pressed Congress for funding to complete the ships.

House investigation and corruption (1876)
In 1869, when Robeson was appointed Secretary of Navy by Grant, he had a total net worth of $20,000 and had "a slender law-practice". A July 1876 Congressional investigation run by the Democratic House, revealed that Robeson deposited $320,000 in his bank account, well above his $8,000 yearly salary, from 1872 to 1876. Robeson had cooperated with the investigating committee giving his testimony and bank deposit information. The investigation revealed that Secretary Robeson gave a Philadelphia feed and grain firm, A. G. Cattell & Co., a $30,000 naval contract.Cattell was soon earning brokerage commissions from other suppliers in order to gain federal naval contracts. In addition to receiving kickbacks, Cattell bought Robeson a vacation home at Long Branch, New York. Cattell's books upon investigation were found to be in disorder, and there was no direct evidence linking Robeson to kickbacks or the purchase of the Long Branch cottage.

The Naval Committee's all-Democratic majority negative report stated that Sec. Robeson had run a "system of corruption" and recommended that he either be impeached by the House Judiciary Committee or that reform laws be made by Congress. No articles of impeachment, however, were drawn up for Robeson. Grant did not ask Robeson to resign and supported the Naval Committee's minority-Republican report that exonerated Robeson. Additionally, Robeson was accused by Admiral Porter of squandering $15,000,000 of missing naval construction funds, and of committing 30 misdemeanors. Porter called Robeson the "cuttlefish" (a cephalopod known for camouflage) of the Navy because he believed Robeson was good at hiding his financial tracks and was supported by Grant's boyhood friend Daniel Ammen. Historians believe Robeson was exceedingly careless and partisan in his role as Secretary of Navy.

U.S. Senate run (1876)
In 1876, Robeson was nominated by the Republican Party to run for the New Jersey U.S. Senate seat. However, corruption charges against Robeson caused him to lose the election.

Defended by Grant (1876)

On December 5, 1876, President Grant defended Robeson inis 8th annual State of the Union Address:
"The fact that our Navy is not more modern and powerful than it is has been made a cause of complaint against the Secretary of the Navy by persons who at the same time criticize and complain of his endeavors to bring the Navy that we have to its best and most efficient condition; but the good sense of the country will understand that it is really due to his practical action that we have at this time any effective naval force at command."

Additionally, Grant requested that Congress give more funding for the completion of the five modernized warships that Robeson had ordered in 1874. Grant stated that the high cost of building new ships was caused by the use of steam power machinery. Grant commented on Robeson's annual report on the condition of the U.S. Navy:
"The report of the Secretary of the Navy shows that branch of the service to be in condition as effective as it is possible to keep it with the means and authority given the Department. It is, of course, not possible to rival the costly and progressive establishments of great European powers with the old material of our Navy, to which no increase has been authorized since the war, except the eight small cruisers built to supply the place of others which had gone to decay. Yet the most has been done that was possible with the means at command; and by substantially rebuilding some of our old ships with durable material and completely repairing and refitting our monitor fleet the Navy has been gradually so brought up that, though it does not maintain its relative position among the progressive navies of the world, it is now in a condition more powerful and effective than it ever has been in time of peace."

Farewell speech (1877)

On March 14, 1877, two days after his term of office ended, Robeson gave a farewell speech to his former subordinate chiefs and clerks at the Naval Department at his luxurious K Street house in Washington D.C. He thanked them for showing up and said that he was leaving office with relief and regret. He said that workers in his Naval Department had served faithfully and that he himself had faithfully and steadily advanced the Naval Department. Robeson admitted he had made mistakes during his long tenure as Secretary of the Navy. He said he had the courage not to deny the rights of any man due to his class.

Legal career Camden County
Robeson left the U.S. Navy Secretary office in March 1877. Having failed in the U.S. Senate bid, Robeson returned to his law practice in Camden County.

Hunter murder trial
Although Robeson previously served as a state prosecutor, he served on the defense team of Benjamin F. Hunter, who was put on trial for the murder of John M. Armstrong. Hunter had loaned Armstrong, a music publisher, $12,000, and had taken out an insurance policy on Armstrong for $26,000, as collateral. Hunter hired Thomas Graham for $500 to kill Armstrong, so Hunter could collect the insurance policy. Armstrong had also owed money to Ford W. Davis, and Hunter plotted to frame Davis for the murder. While Hunter and Armstrong were approaching Davis' home, in Camden, Graham struck Hunter in the head with a hatchet marked "F.W.D." Graham dropped the hatched, ran away, while Hunter took the hatchet, and continued to strike Armstrong in the head. Armstrong later died in Philadelphia of head wounds. Davis was arrested and held in prison for a few weeks. Davis was released, after Graham confessed to the murder, and Hunter's involvement. Hunter was indicted for murder and put on trial June 10, 1878. Robeson and Hunter's defense team argued that there was no evidence Hunter was in Camden at the time of the murder. The jury, however, after 23 days of the trial, convicted Hunter. The case was appealed and rejected. Hunter was executed on July 10, 1879.

U.S. Congress Representative career (1879–1883)

In 1878, Robeson ran for and was elected to the U.S. Congress and served as a U.S. Congressman representing New Jersey's 1st congressional district from March 4, 1879, until March 3, 1881. He was elected to a second term in 1880, serving from March 4, 1881, to March 3, 1883. Although he was criticized in 1882 for allocating a large surplus to the Navy by the Democratic Puck magazine, historians today acknowledge that the U.S. Navy under President Chester A. Arthur, while Robeson was in office, made significant advancements by having all-steel ships. During the 1882 election, Robeson was defeated by Democrat Thomas M. Ferrell in a bitter campaign that left Robeson $60,000 in debt, and he was forced to sell his Washington D.C. property, including his luxurious mansion. Robeson's political enemy, New Jersey U.S. Senator William J. Sewell, a Republican, was behind the Democrat Ferrell's successful campaign. As a result of the election loss, Robeson moved from Camden to Trenton and established a law practice, having been induced to represent the Baltimore and Ohio Railroad.

In 1881, Robeson, while he was U.S. Representative, made another bid for U.S. Senator of New Jersey but again was defeated. During Robeson's tenure in the 47th Congress (1881–1883), he served as chairman of the Committee on Expenditures in the Department of the Navy.

Sued by John Cambell
In 1885, Robeson was sued for $297 by John Cambell, a liveryman, who had aided Robeson during his 1882 First Congressional District election campaign. Cambell had organized horses, the Sixth Regiment Band, and security for Robeson in support of the Republican ticket. Robeson at the time was Treasurer of the Camden County Republican Executive Committee, and Cambell claimed that Robeson did not pay him for his services. Robeson stated that he had paid $75 to the leader of the band and that he paid $258 to 11 constables who were hired for security. Robeson said he did not believe that the hire of security and the band was necessary. Robeson also stated he had paid Cambell a check for $500 in addition to $300 for "political purposes". Robeson admitted he owed Cambell $42 for the hire of carriages. The jury returned a verdict that agreed with Robeson and Cambell was awarded $42 plus three years' interest. Justice Park on the Camden County Circuit Court presided over Robeson's lawsuit trial.

In 1891, Robeson became interested in running for U.S. Congressman for the fourth time. However, the Trenton district was content with the Democratic ticket, and nothing became of Robeson's inquiry into public office.

Death
 
Robeson continued practicing law until his death at the age of 68 on September 27, 1897. He is buried at Belvidere Cemetery in Belvidere, New Jersey. In less than one year after Robeson's death, the five requisitioned warships he ordered in September 1874 fought or served in active duty during the Spanish–American War, which started in April 1898.

Robeson's home was at 214 North Third Street. In 1940, Elizabeth Carlin bought Robeson's former home.

Historical reputation
In 2001, historian Jean Edward Smith said: "[At] Navy, George Robeson, a New Jersey lawyer, had replaced Adop[l]h Borie. Both were successful businessmen whose company Grant enjoyed, and both were content to leave naval matters in the hands of the admirals. Robeson later came under fire for contract improprieties, but congressional investigators found no evidence of illicit payments to the secretary." 

In 2016, historian Ronald C. White said Robeson "was a handsome, jovial man but was portrayed on the Washington social circuit as a "first-rate judge of wine, a second-rate trout fisherman, and a third-rate New Jersey lawyer." Most people added Robeson was a fourth-rate secretary of the navy."

In 2017, historian Ron Chernow said Robeson was a "roly-poly Princeton graduate with muttonchop whiskers and a sociable bent, who had been a brigadier general in the war. He would prove a capable if often slipshod administrator, shadowed by suspicions of corruption."

Historically, Robeson is often mentioned by biographers of Ulysses S. Grant.

Marriage and family
On January 23, 1872, Robeson married Mary Isabella (Ogston) Aulick, a widow with a son, Richmond Aulick. Robeson and Mary had a daughter named Ethel Maxwell Robeson, who married William Sterling, the son of British Maj. John Barton Sterling, on November 22, 1910, in Christ Church, Mayfair, England. Mary's son, Richmond, graduated from Princeton University in 1889.

The embittered 1882 Congressional election loss caused contention in Robeson's family. His wife went abroad and the campaign left Robeson destitute. In New Jersey, Robeson was called derisively "Poor Roby". James L. Hayes selected a small house near the State House in Trenton where Robeson lived and practiced law.

See also

References

Sources

Books
By Author
  scholarly review and response by Calhoun at 
 
 
 
 
 
 
 
 

By Editor

Biographical dictionaries

Websites

External links

 Retrieved on 2008-02-12
 George Maxwell Robeson at The Political Graveyard
 
 Robeson Channel, Bing Maps, retrieved on 10-6-2014

1829 births
1897 deaths
19th-century American politicians
Burials in New Jersey
Grant administration cabinet members
New Jersey Attorneys General
People from Camden County, New Jersey
People from Warren County, New Jersey
People of New Jersey in the American Civil War
Polaris expedition
Republican Party members of the United States House of Representatives from New Jersey
Union Army generals
United States Secretaries of the Navy